Matti Lahti (23 April 1905 – 12 April 1970) was a Finnish wrestler. He competed in the men's freestyle light heavyweight at the 1936 Summer Olympics.

References

External links
 

1905 births
1970 deaths
Finnish male sport wrestlers
Olympic wrestlers of Finland
Wrestlers at the 1936 Summer Olympics
People from Isokyrö
Sportspeople from Ostrobothnia (region)